Pachnistis nigropunctella is a moth in the family Autostichidae. It was described by Viette in 1955. It is found in Madagascar.

References

Moths described in 1955
Pachnistis
Taxa named by Edward Meyrick